Silver Lake is a small, freshwater reservoir in Southeastern Minnesota.

Description
The lake lies on the South Fork of the Zumbro River, about one-half mile north of downtown Rochester.

The electrical power plant operated by Rochester Public Utilities used the lake for cooling.  Since the lake operates as a heat sink, it doesn't freeze in the winter.  The warm water attracted a large number of Canada geese that remain in the area year round. [The RPU plant has since shut down, and the lake now freezes during the winter. Rochester government has been implementing various plans to cull the Canada Goose population. These plans include egg oiling, which was performed by volunteers in 2021. The city of Rochester is also planning of replacing eggs with ceramic replacements in the spring of 2022 in order to curb the presence of the geese.]

Public park surrounds most of the lake.  In the summer, paddleboat and canoe rental is available.

Silver Lake is the home to the Rochester Rowing Club, whose members practice there daily.

References
"Silver Lake". Minnesota Department of Natural Resources.  Retrieved January 2, 2008.
Rochester Parks.  City of Rochester, Minnesota.  Retrieved September 7, 2017.

[https://www.kttc.com/2022/02/04/rochester-goose-egg-oiling-start-again-spring-volunteers-needed/

Reservoirs in Minnesota
Rochester, Minnesota
Lakes of Olmsted County, Minnesota
[[Category:Tourist attractions in Olmsted County, Minnesota